This article contains records and statistics for the Japanese professional football club, Kawasaki Frontale.

J.League

Key

Domestic cup competitions

Japan Football League (JFL)

Key
Points: 90min win – 3 points, Extra Time win (sudden death) – 2 points, PK win after Extra Time – 1 point, Any lost – 0 point
In 1998, Kawasaki attended ""J1 Participation Tournament"", and lost at 1st round.

Major international competitions

Continental record

Top scorers by season

References

Kawasaki Frontale
Kawasaki Frontale